Beem is a surname. Notable people with the surname include:

 David Enoch Beem (1837–1923), lawyer, banker, and American Civil War veteran
 Eva and Abraham Beem (born 1930s), Holocaust victims
 Frances Beem (1881–1971), early 20th century American author and illustrator
 Rich Beem (born 1970), American professional golfer
 Sophie Beem (born 1999), American singer and songwriter